The Garibaldi-Meucci Museum, formerly known as the Garibaldi Memorial, is a circa 1840 Gothic Revival cottage in the Rosebank section of Staten Island, New York. It was home to inventor and candle maker Antonio Meucci (1808–1889). The Italian revolutionary and political leader Giuseppe Garibaldi (1807–1882) lived there from 1851 to 1853.

In 1884 a plaque commemorating Garibaldi's stay was placed on the building, with Meucci in attendance. The house was moved from its original nearby location in 1907 and placed within an open air colonnaded memorial pavilion, which was later removed. The memorial was dedicated in 1907 to mark Garibaldi's 100th birthday. Since then, the site has been the location of a number of protests and celebrations on the anniversary of Garibaldi's birth.

A memorial to Meucci was erected in the front yard in 1923. In 1956 the house was opened as the Garibaldi-Meucci Museum, helping to celebrate Italian-American heritage and culture, as well as the lives of Giuseppe Garibaldi and Antonio Meucci.  The museum is owned by the National Order Sons of Italy Foundation and administered by the New York Grand Lodge Order Sons of Italy in America.

After a major restoration, the museum was rededicated in a ceremony on July 11, 2009, involving museum president John Dabbene, Salvatore Lanzilotta, president of the New York State Order of the Sons of Italy in America, and U.S. Congressional Representative Michael McMahon.

The site was listed on the U.S. National Register of Historic Places in 1980.

See also 
 Casa Belvedere, another landmark in Staten Island related to the Italian-American experience.
 List of New York City Designated Landmarks in Staten Island
 National Register of Historic Places listings in Richmond County, New York

References

External links 

 Garibaldi-Meucci Museum  - official site
 Order Sons Of Italy In America website

Houses on the National Register of Historic Places in Staten Island
Gothic Revival architecture in New York (state)
Museums in Staten Island
Historic house museums in New York City
Ethnic museums in New York City
Biographical museums in New York City
Houses completed in 1840
New York City Designated Landmarks in Staten Island
Italian-American museums
Museums established in 1956
Giuseppe Garibaldi
1956 establishments in New York City